The first season of Bachelor in Paradise premiered on August 4, 2014, a week after season ten of The Bachelorette, with the season finale airing on September 8, 2014. Chris Harrison reprised his role from The Bachelor and The Bachelorette as the host of the show.

Production
In March 2013, ABC canceled Bachelor Pad after three seasons. ABC then announced a new spin-off series, Bachelor In Paradise. The season was filmed in Tulum, Mexico.

Contestants
The first batch of contestants were revealed on June 4, 2014, but only 14 contestants were confirmed. On July 14, 2014, an additional 11 contestants were revealed, resulting in 25 contestants.

Elimination Table

Key 

 The contestant is male.
 The contestant is female.

 The contestant had a date and gave out a rose at the rose ceremony.
 The contestant went on a date and got a rose at the rose ceremony.
 The contestant gave or received a rose at the rose ceremony, thus remaining in the competition.
 The contestant received the last rose.
 The contestant went on a date and received the last rose. 
 The contestant went on a date and rejected a rose and ended up getting eliminated.
 The contestant went on a date and was eliminated.
 The contestant was eliminated.
 The contestant had a date and voluntarily left the show
 The contestant voluntarily left the show.
 The contestant quit the show after being in a relationship back home.
 The contestant quit due to injury.
 The couple broke up and was eliminated.
 The couple decided to stay together and won the competition.
 The contestant had to wait to appear in paradise.

Episodes

Post Show
In December 2014, Michelle and Cody announced that they decided to end their relationship, and got back together in June 2015, but later broke up again. In 2016 they appeared on Marriage Boot Camp, where they broke up again.

Marcus and Lacy were wed by Chris Harrison on the season premiere of season 2 of Bachelor in Paradise.  However, in July 2016 Marcus admitted that the two were never legally married and have since broken up.

Clare returned to Paradise for season 2.  She was eliminated in week 3.

References

External links 
 

2014 American television seasons
Paradise 01
Television shows set in Mexico